Akaroa was a Norwegian sailing ship that was torpedoed by the German submarine  in the English Channel, 70 miles west off the Casquets, Guernsey while she was travelling from Philadelphia, United States to Rouen, France with a cargo of oil.

Construction 
Akaroa was constructed in 1881 with yard no. 53 at the Osbourne, Graham & Co. Ltd. shipyard in Sunderland, United Kingdom. She was completed in October 1881.

She had 3 masts and sailed the seas for almost 36 years.

Sinking 
On 1 September 1917, Akaroa was on a voyage from Philadelphia, United States, to Rouen, France. When she was suddenly struck by the torpedoes from the German submarine  70 miles west of the Casquets, Guernsey. While passing underneath the sinking Akaroa, the submarine damaged its periscope. The crew all made it safely to the ship's two lifeboats and sailed and rowed to the French coast which they eventually reached 36 hours later. At the time of her sinking Akaroa was carrying a cargo of oil.

There were no casualties reported.

References

1881 ships
Ships built on the River Wear
Sailing ships of Norway
World War I merchant ships of Norway
Maritime incidents in 1917
Ships sunk by German submarines in World War I
World War I shipwrecks in the English Channel
Ships sunk with no fatalities